Lars Christer Larsson (born December 11, 1965) is a former rallycross driver from Sweden. He is usually referred to as "Lasse" or sometimes as "Stinsen".

Career
Larsson started his rallycross career in the Swedish Rallycross Championship, winning the National Division in 1996, 1997 and 1998. He progressed to the FIA European Rallycross Championship in 2000, driving an Audi A4 in Division 1 for his own team. His breakthrough came in 2006, when he broke the dominance of Kenneth Hansen, winning the Division 1 title by three points in a Škoda Fabia. He defended his title in 2007, with Hansen finishing second again.

Retirement
Larsson retired after the 2007 season and joined his family's trucking company in Svenljunga. His son Robin currently competes in the FIA European Rallycross Championship and is the 2014 Supercar Champion.

Racing record

Complete FIA European Rallycross Championship results

Division 1

Publications
Lasse "Stinsen" Larsson – Det går som på räls, by Lars Larsson & Morgan Björk, 160 pages, Swedish language,

References

External  links

1965 births
Living people
Swedish racing drivers
People from Västergötland